Michael C. Corcoran (born 1967) is an American lobbyist and fundraiser based out of Florida and with close personal and professional connections to the Republican establishment.

Background
Corcoran was born in Toronto, Canada. received a business degree in 1990 from St. Leo University. He worked in marketing in Dallas and in Santiago, Chile. He was a fundraiser for the Republican Party of Florida under Daniel Webster. From 1992, he was legislative aide in Florida House District 62 to Buddy Johnson and (from 1996) to former House Speaker Johnnie Byrd. He then worked as a legislative and governmental affairs consultant for Metz, Hauser & Husband PA.

Lobbying career
Corcoran founded Corcoran & Associates with his wife Jessica Ray Corcoran (b. 1972) in 2001. His early business was buoyed by easy access to his ally Byrd, who became House Speaker in 2002. This influence was criticized, as was Byrd's hiring of Corcoran's sister Jacqueline ("Jackie").

With the addition of Jeff Johnson, the firm became Corcoran & Johnson. In 2019, the firm was rebranded Corcoran Partners.

In 2021, Corcoran Partners took in $5.9 million in lobbying fees. Corcoran & Johnson's revenue expanded considerably in 2018. In 2012, the firm generated $2.4 million in legislative fees.

Political committees
Corcoran chairs the Building a Better Florida political committee. He chaired Florida Attorney General Ashley Moody's Finance Committee in 2017 and her Inauguration Committee in 2019. Corcoran was also a prominent supporter of Marco Rubio.

Personal
Michael and Jessica met while campaigning for Republican state representative Buddy Johnson. The couple has four children. They reside in Odessa, Florida.

His brother Richard Corcoran is former speaker of the Florida House. His sister Jacqueline Corcoran is also a lobbyist with his firm.

References

External links
 Building a Better Florida Political Committee donations

Florida Republicans
American lobbyists
Saint Leo University alumni
Living people
1967 births